The second inauguration of George Washington as president of the United States was held in the Senate Chamber of Congress Hall in Philadelphia, Pennsylvania on Monday, March 4, 1793. The inauguration marked the commencement of the second four-year term of George Washington as president and of John Adams as vice president. The presidential oath of office was administered to George Washington by Associate Justice William Cushing. This was the first inauguration to take place in Philadelphia (then the nation's capital), and took place exactly four years after the new federal government began operations under the U.S. Constitution.

Inaugural address 
George Washington's second inaugural address remains the shortest ever delivered, at just 135 words.

See also
Presidency of George Washington
First inauguration of George Washington
1792 United States presidential election

References

External links

More documents from the Library of Congress
Text of Washington's Second Inaugural Address

1793 in Pennsylvania
1793 in American politics
Washington 2
Inauguration 1793
Washington 2
Inaug 2